Euro Marine Logistics NV (EML) is a European short sea roll-on/roll-off shipping and logistics company, with headquarters in Brussels, Belgium. It was originally jointly owned by Mitsui O.S.K. Lines and Höegh Autoliners, before MOL acquired full ownership in December 2019.

History
In 1990, Euro Marine Carrier B.V. (EMC) was established in Amsterdam, Netherlands by three partners, Nissan Motor Car Carrier (51%), Mitsui O.S.K. Lines (24.5%) and Höegh Autoliners (24.5%).

In 2011, after a change in share ownership, the assets of EMC were transferred to Euro Marine Logistics, which was based in Wemmel, Belgium as a venture between Mitsui O.S.K. Lines and Hoegh Autoliners.

Today the company specializes in the domestic maritime transport and distribution of cargo such as automobiles, trucks, trailers, Mafi roll trailers, heavy construction machineries and further types of rolling freight.

Fleet 
EML operates a fleet of fifteen ships with capacity of 33,000 CEU on six shipping routes. It serves 27 commercial ports in 17 different countries, operating in the Mediterranean Sea, North Sea and Baltic Sea. The company transported 950,000 CEU in 2015.

Environment
Short sea shipping is the most ecological and cheapest mode of transportation. EML use ultra-low-sulfur diesel and is part of the Trident Alliance.

Facts and accidents
On 5 December 2012, EML suffered the worst accident up to date, when a vessel of its fleet, the MV Baltic Ace, sank in the North Sea after a collision with the Cyprus-registered container ship Corvus J, and 11 Crew members died.

On 3 December 2015, EML operated mv City of Rotterdam collided with another roll-on/roll-off vessel - the Primula Seaways, reporting severe hull damages and requiring urgent repair work. The vessel was departing Rotterdam when the accident happened. The harbour pilot and Captain on board were both investigated, and finally given a four month prison sentence.

See also

United European Car Carriers
Nissan Motor Car Carrier
KESS - K Line Europe Short Sea
Toyofuji Shipping
Nippon Yusen Kaisha

References

Ships gallery

External links

Shipping companies of Belgium
Companies based in Flemish Brabant
Ro-ro shipping companies
Car carrier shipping companies